BC Transit Health Connections or simply Health Connections are a supplementary interregional public transit bus service provided by BC Transit in various communities throughout the province of British Columbia. While, as the title implies, the scheduled services are geared towards passengers needing to reach an urban centre for health reasons, all are able to use the service if space allows.

Operations 

Health connections buses are marked BC Transit buses. While they operate on a fixed schedule along a fixed route (with exceptions), no number designation is given to the buses and they are generally not listed in local transit guides, timetables or on departure boards. Like other BC Transit services, Health Connections buses are operated by a contracted operator and not by BC Transit itself. The services are funded in part by the provincial government as a complement to the Travel Assistance Program. In February 2020, BC Transit announced that no direct connection between Logan Lake and Kamloops would be maintained after that March, with all services routing direct to Merritt instead.

Service and routing 

Health Connections operate within and between various transit systems already served by BC Transit, and sometimes parallel existing routes on a different schedule. Nearly all Health Connections operate on only select days or the week, while others only operate on demand. The routes are the only passenger transportation available to some major communities that are currently lacking in any form of intercity bus.

References

BC Transit